Margaret Elizabeth Letham (born 21 June 1956) is a female lawn and indoor bowler. From Hamilton, South Lanarkshire, in Scotland and started bowling at the age of 15.

Bowls career

World Outdoor Championships
Letham has won medals at four World Outdoor Championships. Starting with a pairs gold with Joyce Lindores in 2000 in Moama, Australia and then a singles bronze four years later in Leamington Spa. The third medal came eight years later when she was part of the four that won gold in Adelaide, the four consisted of Letham, Caroline Brown, Lynn Stein and Michelle Cooper. At the same event she also won the pairs bronze partnering Claire Johnston.

Commonwealth Games
She won gold medal at the 1998 Commonwealth Games in Kuala Lumpur, Malaysia and had competed in five consecutive Commonwealth Games for Scotland from 1998 until 2014.

International
In 1999 she won the singles silver medal and pairs gold medal at the Atlantic Bowls Championships.

Six years later in 2005, she won the pairs and fours silver medals at the Championships and in 2007 she a second pairs gold medal at the Championships. In 2009 she won her third pairs gold medal before winning a fourth pairs gold medal (and seventh medal in total) at the 2011 Championships in Paphos.

In 2008, she won the Hong Kong International Bowls Classic singles title.

National
Letham has won the Scottish National Bowls Championships singles title on two occasions in 1999 and 2019. In 2022, she won the women's singles at the British Isles Bowls Championships.

References 

Scottish female bowls players
1956 births
Living people
Bowls World Champions
Sportspeople from Hamilton, South Lanarkshire
Bowls players at the 1998 Commonwealth Games
Bowls players at the 2002 Commonwealth Games
Bowls players at the 2006 Commonwealth Games
Bowls players at the 2010 Commonwealth Games
Bowls players at the 2014 Commonwealth Games
Commonwealth Games gold medallists for Scotland
Commonwealth Games medallists in lawn bowls
Medallists at the 1998 Commonwealth Games